"Low" is a song by American singer Lenny Kravitz, from his eleventh studio album Raise Vibration, featuring posthumous guest vocals from Michael Jackson. It was released as the album's second single on May 25, 2018.

Background
The song explores the perils of his near-mythical sensuality with intonations alluding to his past intimate relationships. For this track Kravitz took inspiration from Michael Jackson with whom he produced the song "(I Can't Make It) Another Day" in 1999, which was later included in Jackson's first posthumous album Michael. "Low" also contains some vocal parts by Jackson. Kravitz explains that "A lot of people say: Oh, you’re going with that Michael Jackson impersonation. No, that’s him."

Video
The video was released on 5 June 2018 on the singer's YouTube channel. The video features images of Kravitz's family, dating back to the 1960s. On 11 July the second video was released, directed by French director and photographer Jean-Baptiste Mondino, where Kravitz sings on a rotating platform and is later joined by drummer Jas Kayser who plays while singing along to the song.

Reception
"Low" became Kravitz's first song to peak #1 on Billboard'''s Dance Club Songs, thanks to several remixes by David Guetta, Tom Stephan, and Junior Black. Madison Desler of Paste'' wrote, "Worth the price of admission is “Low,” a funk-tinged easy-groover about keeping a relationship grounded. It’s sexy, it’s smooth, and it’s dance floor ready. And yes, that’s Michael Jackson on backing vocals—maybe one of the most absolute stamps of cool there is."

Charts

Weekly charts

Year-end charts

Certifications

References

2018 singles
2018 songs
Lenny Kravitz songs
Michael Jackson songs
Songs written by Lenny Kravitz
Music videos directed by Jean-Baptiste Mondino